Aladdin (Asset, Liability and Debt and Derivative Investment Network) is an electronic system built by BlackRock Solutions, the risk management division of the largest investment management corporation, BlackRock, Inc. In 2013, it handled about $11 trillion in assets (including BlackRock's $4.1 trillion assets), which was about 7% of the world's financial assets, and kept track of about 30,000 investment portfolios. As of 2020, Aladdin managed $21.6 trillion in assets. 

Senior Managing Director Sudhir Nair is the current Global Head of BlackRock's Aladdin program.

Popular references
Adam Curtis's 2016 documentary HyperNormalisation cites the Aladdin system as an example of how modern technocrats attempt to manage the complications of the real world.

Technology
Aladdin uses the following technologies: Linux, Java, Hadoop, Docker, Kubernetes, Zookeeper, Splunk, ELK Stack, Git, Apache, Nginx, Sybase ASE, Snowflake, Cognos, FIX, Swift object storage, REST, AngularJS, TREP.

It was built/upgraded using Julia, i.e. "analytics modules for" were written in Julia.  It has also been reported that it was written originally in C++, Java and  Perl.

See also
 BlackRock
 SecDB (Goldman Sachs)

References

BlackRock
Computer systems